Satoshi Fujisaki ( is a Japanese mixed martial artist. He competed in the Lightweight division.

Mixed martial arts record

|-
| Win
| align=center| 2-1-2
| Makoto Ishikawa
| Decision (unanimous)
| Shooto: Shooter's Passion
| 
| align=center| 2
| align=center| 5:00
| Setagaya, Tokyo, Japan
| 
|-
| Draw
| align=center| 1-1-2
| Kohei Yasumi
| Draw
| Shooto: Renaxis 1
| 
| align=center| 2
| align=center| 5:00
| Tokyo, Japan
| 
|-
| Win
| align=center| 1-1-1
| Kyuhei Ueno
| Submission (armbar)
| Shooto: Shooter's Dream
| 
| align=center| 1
| align=center| 2:23
| Setagaya, Tokyo, Japan
| 
|-
| Loss
| align=center| 0-1-1
| Kazumichi Takada
| Decision (unanimous)
| Shooto: Gig '98 1st
| 
| align=center| 2
| align=center| 5:00
| Tokyo, Japan
| 
|-
| Draw
| align=center| 0-0-1
| Dokonjonosuke Mishima
| Draw
| Shooto: Las Grandes Viajes 1
| 
| align=center| 2
| align=center| 5:00
| Tokyo, Japan
|

See also
List of male mixed martial artists

References

Japanese male mixed martial artists
Lightweight mixed martial artists
Living people
Year of birth missing (living people)